The Aeron chair is an office chair sold by Herman Miller, first released in 1994. In 2010, it was called "America's best-selling chair". It is featured in the Museum of Modern Art's permanent collection. It was designed by Don Chadwick and Bill Stumpf and has received numerous accolades for its industrial design.

Name
The chair was reportedly named after the Celtic god Aeron, as well as referring to aeration and aeronautics.

Ergonomics
According to a 2010 Bloomberg Businessweek article, the Aeron chair "made a fetish of lumbar support". Galen Kranz has commented that while the company is aware that a perching position (facilitated by the chair's rounded front rail) is preferable, it put in the lumbar support to conform to public expectations—"because that's what people think is required for it to be a scientifically 'good' chair".

Sitting expert A. C. Mandal has criticized the Aeron as "far too low" and not offering enough height adjustment and opportunities for the sitter to move. According to the chair's co-designer Don Chadwick, the task given to him by Herman Miller was to update the company's previous best-seller, not to design the ideal chair for an eight-hour workday. "We were given a brief and basically told to design the next-generation office chair," Chadwick said.

In 2017, the chair was updated as "Aeron Remastered" (versus the original now named as "Aeron Classic") with a new suspension system, better spine support and re-engineered tilt.

Materials
As described by Galen Cranz, "one of the secrets of the success of that chair was finding that fabric they called ‘pellicle’. That sheer but resistant fabric hit on the right gestalt for where our culture was at." The suspended 'pellicle' seat and backrest are moulded into glass-fiber reinforced plastic frames. The Aeron chair is made out of recycled materials, and 94 percent of the chair itself is recyclable.

Market
Aeron chairs are produced by Herman Miller and were popular with web startups during the late 1990s, when they were associated with the dot-com bubble. A 2006 article in New York magazine called the Aeron "the Dot-Com Throne", writing that the chairs "became shorthand for the countless companies that didn't have a clue how to make money on the Internet, but, man, did they have the know-how to set up a cool office". The Aerons were so popular that after the bubble burst, one commenter described the piles of unused chairs as reminiscent of a "corporate graveyard" of office furniture. The big volume of sales led Herman Miller through the uncertainty following the bubble. As of 2016, Herman Miller had sold nearly 7 million units, and more than a million chairs are produced every year.

See also
 List of chairs

References

External links
 Herman Miller Aeron Product page
 The Untold Story of How the Aeron Chair was Born

Products introduced in 1994
Chairs
Individual models of furniture